Ploshchevo is a rural locality (a village) in Karinskoye Rural Settlement, Alexandrovsky District, Vladimir Oblast, Russia. The population was 26 as of 2010. There are 5 streets.

Geography 
Ploshchevo is located 31 km southwest of Alexandrov (the district's administrative centre) by road. Zhabrevo is the nearest rural locality.

References 

Rural localities in Alexandrovsky District, Vladimir Oblast